Yellow loosestrife is a common name for several plants in the genus Lysimachia and may refer to:

Lysimachia × commixta, native to eastern North America
Lysimachia punctata
Lysimachia vulgaris, native to Europe